Lough Bunny is a freshwater lake in the Burren, County Clare, Ireland.

Geography

Hydrology
Lough Bunny has no permanent inflow or outflow. It is fed by springs and drains into fissures around the lake's northern end. The lake is oligotrophic.

Natural history
Fish species in Lough Bunny include perch, rudd, pike and the critically endangered European eel.

Administration
The lake lies within the jurisdiction of Clare County Council, and is within the Mid-West Region of Ireland.  Lough Bunny is within the Burren and Cliffs of Moher Geopark, the Burren National Park, and the East Burren Complex Special Area of Conservation, overseen by the National Parks and Wildlife Service.

See also
List of loughs in Ireland

References

Bunny